Bega is a surname. Notable people with the surname include:

Alessandro Bega (born 1991), Italian tennis player
Cornelis Pietersz Bega (died 1664), Dutch painter
Francesco Bega (born 1974), Italian footballer
Leslie Bega (born 1967), American actress
Lou Bega (born 1975), German pop singer
Saint Bega, probably mythical Irish princess